Rhinocolinae is a subfamily of jumping plant louse in the family Aphalaridae.

Genera 
 Agonoscena Enderlein, 1914
 Ameroscena Burckhardt & Lauterer, 1989
 Anomalopsylla Tuthill, 1952
 Apsylla Crawford, 1912
 Cerationotum Burckhardt & Lauterer, 1989
 Crucianus Burckhardt & Lauterer, 1989
 Leurolophus Tuthill, 1942
 Lisronia Loginova, 1976
 Megagonoscena Burckhardt & Lauterer, 1989
 Moraniella Loginova, 1972
 Notophyllura Hodkinson, 1986
 Rhinocola Förster, 1848
 Rhusaphalara Park & Lee, 1982
 Tainarys Brèthes, 1920
 Protoscena Klimaszewski, 1997
Note:  = extinct

References

External links 

Aphalaridae